Campbell Trophy may refer to:

Campbell Trophy (Grand Prix), a race held between 1937 and 1939
William V. Campbell Trophy, a National Football Foundation trophy awarded to college football players
Clarence S. Campbell Bowl, a National Hockey League trophy awarded to the Western Conference playoff champions

See also
 Campbell Award (disambiguation)